Louise Wadley is an Australian film director, producer, writer, and cinematographer. She is best known for her piece All About E (2015), which she wrote and directed. Wadley is also a director and contributor to Girl’s Own Pictures, which released All About E as its debut film.

Early life and education 
Louise Wadley graduated from the National Film and Television School in the United Kingdom.

Career 
Wadley teaches film at both Sydney Film School and the city's University of Technology.

All About E
Louise Wadley describes the making of All About E as somewhat of a feminist endeavor, stating the importance that "the focus is on her [E's] own journey and not just about her sexual or cultural identity." As well as being a large, ambitious-yet-low-budget production, this was also Wadley's first feature film. Wadley discusses the phenomenon of depressing films about lesbians, and that she had fun making a lesbian comedy instead. She cites inspiration from The Adventures of Priscilla, Queen of the Desert, and Muriel's Wedding.

Personal life
Wadley is an out lesbian.

Filmography

Awards and nominations 
The soundtrack of All About E was nominated for APRA Best Soundtrack Album in 2015. Wadley also won a Silver Clio Award in 2016 for To Russia With Love and "Best Short" at the Milan International Lesbian and Gay Festival for Just A Little Crush.

Further reading 
 Benson, Chloe (Spring 2015). Queer capers: All about E and lesbian cinema, Metro Magazine, No. 186, pp. 20–25, via Informit.

See also 
 List of Australian film directors
 List of female film and television directors
 List of lesbian filmmakers
 List of LGBT-related films directed by women
 List of Women Film Directors

References

External links 
 

Living people
Australian film directors
Australian film producers
Australian screenwriters
Australian women screenwriters
Australian women film directors
Australian lesbian artists
LGBT film directors
LGBT film producers
Australian LGBT screenwriters
Alumni of the National Film and Television School
Academic staff of the University of Technology Sydney
Year of birth missing (living people)
Place of birth missing (living people)